Annie Jones Elliot (July 14, 1865  October 22, 1902) was an American bearded woman, born in Virginia. She toured with showman P. T. Barnum as a circus attraction. Whether the cause of her condition was hirsutism or an unrelated genetic condition that affects children of both sexes and continues into adult years is unknown. Many photographers, including Mathew Brady, took her portraits during her lifetime, which were widely distributed. As an adult, Jones became the country's top "bearded lady" and acted as a spokesperson for Barnum's "Freaks", a word she tried to abolish from the business. Jones married Richard Elliot in 1881, but divorced him in 1895 for her childhood sweetheart William Donovan, who died, leaving Jones a widow. In 1902, Jones died in Brooklyn of tuberculosis.

Biography
Annie Jones was born in Virginia, the county seat of Smyth County, in the southwestern end of the Commonwealth, on July 14, 1865.  When Jones joined P. T. Barnum's exhibition as a child of only nine months, Jones' parents received a $150-a-week salary. She was billed as a new "infant Esau". By the age of five, she had a mustache, sideburns, and beard, and became well known as the "Bearded Girl". Photographer Mathew Brady took Jones' portrait as a child in 1865. A number of additional portraits were taken of Jones during her lifetime and were widely distributed.

When she was about five years old, Jones went touring with Barnum's "Greatest Show on Earth", appearing in the circus sideshow and also in dime museums. When she was 16, Jones married a barker named Richard Elliot. They divorced 15 years later, and Jones subsequently married William Donovan, who worked in the show's wardrobe. They toured Europe, but then Donovan died a few years later and Jones re-joined Barnum's circus.

In an incident which may have been one of Barnum's publicity stunts, a New York phrenologist kidnapped Jones when she was a young child. Barnum and the police found her exhibited in a church fair. When the man claimed the child as his, the matter went to court. The judge had Jones separated from the others before it was her time to testify. When the child was taken to the courtroom, she went straight to her parents when she saw them. The judge declared the case closed.

References

External links 

The Human Marvels Biography, J. Tithonus Pednaud
Bearded Ladies
Monkey Girl

1865 births
1902 deaths
20th-century deaths from tuberculosis
Bearded women
Ethnological show business
People from Marion, Virginia
People with hypertrichosis
Sideshow performers
Tuberculosis deaths in New York (state)